The 2014 RallyRACC Catalunya — Costa Daurada was the twelfth round of the 2014 World Rally Championship season. The event was based in Salou, Catalonia, and started on 23 October and finished on 26 October after seventeen special stages, totaling just under 373 competitive kilometres.

French driver Sébastien Ogier won the rally for the second time and in doing so became the 2014 World Rally Championship Drivers champion with a round to spare. It was Ogier's second consecutive WRC title since joining Volkswagen in 2013.

Entry list

Results

Event standings

Special stages

Power Stage
The "Power stage" was a  stage at the end of the rally.

Standings after the rally

WRC

Drivers' Championship standings

Manufacturers' Championship standings

Other

WRC2 Drivers' Championship standings

WRC3 Drivers' Championship standings

Junior WRC Drivers' Championship standings

References

Results – juwra.com/World Rally Archive
Results – ewrc-results.com

Catalunya
Rally Catalunya
Catalunya Rally